Gogo Salt Lick is a salt lick located in Kenya.

History 
Gogo has been known as a place of Mûnyû (salt) for hundreds of years in Embu land,  since the founding of the Embu Community.

According to the Mbeere Historical Texts by Prof Mwaniki Kabeca (2005), Gogo is the place where Mwenendega, the founder of Embu tribe, met his wife Nthara. Kabeca narrates that Mwenendega, who lived near the current Mwenendega grove in Runyenjes, took his cattle to drink at the Gogo Salt Lick and found a girl who refused to talk to him at first. After much cajoling, she spoke with him and made him swear never to tell her negative things or abuse her, as there would be consequences.

Geography and location 
Gogo Salt Lick is located in Mukuuri, near the banks of the Gogo River that separates Mûkûûrî and Gitare localities at the edge of a ridge called Mürurîrî. At least five acres on the banks of the Gogo River, surrounding the salt lick, have been reserved for community use. The five-acre Gogo meadows, which surrounds the salt lick, is populated by indigenous trees.

Chemistry 
The Gogo Salt Lick is an area of water puddles fed by slow seeping springs and traditionally used by wildlife and livestock. The salty water that oozes from the undergrounds empties into the Gogo River. Salt licks occur in areas of both sedimentary and volcanic bedrock. They occur rarely in granitic bedrock except where overlain by calcareous glacial till.

Well established mineral licks, like Gogo, typically appear as open muddy areas and are usually characterised by well-worn trails radiating from them. Animals from Kenya, such as buffaloes, gazelles, zebras; and domestic ones such as cattle, goats and sheep, come to such salt licks to ingest the crucial sodium and chloride minerals, which they need to survive.

References 

Geography of Kenya
Embu County